Don Andrés Garchitorena was born in Tigaon, Camarines Sur. He was member of the revolutionary group headed by Emilio Aguinaldo in Hong Kong during the Spanish–American War. In 1919, he was elected Governor of Ambos Camarines Sur.

He is the father of Don Mariano Garchitorena, Secretary of Agriculture and Commerce, and Governor of Camarines Sur. He is also the grandfather of Andres Centenera, a famous Philippine actor.

Year of death missing
Governors of Camarines Sur
Year of birth missing
People from Camarines Sur